NIOA is an Australian armament and munitions company, headquartered in Brisbane, Queensland, Australia. Owned by the Nioa family, it is a privately held company which is a supplier of arms and ammunition to the sporting, law enforcement and military markets. Its founder and CEO, Robert Nioa, is a son-in-law of Australian federal politician Bob Katter.

History
NIOA was involved with controversial importations of Adler shotguns into Australia during the 2010s.

On 28 July 2016, NIOA was awarded a contract to supply 40 mm automatic grenade launchers to the Australian Army.

On 15 November 2017, NIOA was selected by the New Zealand Defence Force to supply weapons. On 5 December 2017, NIOA signed a contract with the Australian Department of Defence to supply the Australian Defence Force with multiple types of ammunition.

On 23 January 2018, NIOA was awarded a contract by the Australian Army to supply 155 mm artillery ammunitions.

On 1 November 2019, former Australian politician David Feeney was appointed to the advisory board of NIOA.

On 29 June 2020, NIOA agreed to enter into a joint tenancy, alongside Thales Australia, of the government-owned munitions factory in Benalla. On 9 December 2020, NIOA entered into an agreement with Olin Corporation to supply the Australian Defence Force with small arms ammunitions.

On 3 June 2021, NIOA had partnered with Black Sky Aerospace and Quickstep in their bid under the Australian Missile Corporation for the Australian Government's sovereign guided missiles project.

On 17 January 2023, NIOA acquired full ownership of Barrett Firearms Manufacturing, an American rifle manufacturer.

See also

List of firearm brands
List of modern armament manufacturers

References

External links
 

Australian companies established in 1973
Ammunition manufacturers
Companies based in Brisbane
Defence companies of Australia
Family-owned companies of Australia
Firearm manufacturers of Australia
Manufacturing companies established in 1973
Privately held companies of Australia
Retail companies established in 1973
Retail companies of Australia
Sporting goods retailers of Australia